Sarcochilus, commonly known as butterfly orchids or fairy bells is a genus of about twenty species of flowering plants in the orchid family, Orchidaceae. Most species are epiphytes but a few species only grow on rocks or in leaf litter. Orchids in this genus usually have short stems, leaves arranged in two rows and flowers arranged along unbranched flowering stems. Most species are endemic to Australia but some are found in New Guinea and New Caledonia.

Description
Orchids in the genus Sarcochilus are epiphytic or lithophytic monopodial herbs with fibrous stems and long, relatively broad leaves folded lengthwise and arranged in two ranks. The flowers are scented, resupinate and arranged on an unbranched flowering stem, each flower on a short thin stalk. The sepals and petals are free from and similar to each other except that the petals are usually smaller than the sepals. The labellum is hinged to the column and has three lobes. The sides lobes are relatively large and upright, sometimes curving inwards. The structure of the middle lobe varies between species.

Taxonomy and naming
The genus Sarcochilus was first formally described in 1810 by Robert Brown and the description was published in Prodromus Florae Novae Hollandiae et Insulae Van Diemen. The name Sarcochilus is derived from the Ancient Greek words sarx meaning "flesh" and cheilos meaning "lip", referring to the fleshy labellum of these orchids.

The genus Sarcochilus has been shown to be non-monophyletic.

Species
The following is a list of Sarcochilus species recognised by Plants of the World Online as of March 2023. The common names in the list below are those used by David Jones.

Use in horticulture
The term "sarco" is often used to refer to a number of orchid genera, including Sarcochilus. Most species of Sarcochilus are easily grown but some are very difficult. They need bright light, high humidity and free air movement.

References

External links

 
Vandeae genera
Epiphytic orchids